Litto may refer to:

People
 Litto, also known as Lippo II Alidosi (died 1350), Italian ruler
 Litto Nebbia (born 1948), Argentinian musician
 George Litto (1930-2019), American producer
 Maria Litto (1919–1996), German ballet dancer

Places
 Litto, Latin and Italian name of the ancient city of Lyctus, Crete
 Monte Litto, Campania, Italy

See also
 Lito (disambiguation)